The following highways are numbered 765:

India
 National Highway 765 (India)

United States